Riverside station is a commuter rail stop on the Metro-North Railroad's New Haven Line, located in the Riverside area of Greenwich, Connecticut. The Riverside Avenue Bridge crosses over the west end of the station platforms.

Station layout
The station has two high-level side platforms each six cars long.

The station has 324 parking spaces, 307 owned by the state.

References

External links

State Department of Transportation inspection report, January, 2007
Connecticut Department of Transportation "Condition Inspection for the Riverside Station" report, September 2002
Riverside Avenue bridge
 Riverside Avenue entrance from Google Maps Street View
 http://www.ct.gov/dot/lib/dot/documents/dpt/1_Station_Inspection_Summary_Report.pdf

Metro-North Railroad stations in Connecticut
Stations on the Northeast Corridor
Stations along New York, New Haven and Hartford Railroad lines
Railroad stations in Fairfield County, Connecticut
Buildings and structures in Greenwich, Connecticut